FATULS, the Federation of Arab Trade Unions and Labor Societies (Ittihad al-Niqabat wa'l-Jam'iyyat al-'Arabiyya, later known as the Arab Workers' Congress) was an Arab trade union organization formed in 1942 in Mandatory Palestine by Marxist activists led by Bulus Farah (a former member of the Palestine Communist Party), who split away from the Palestine Arab Workers Society in 1942. By the end of that year it had recruited around 1,500 members, including workers in the Haifa area petroleum sector, Haifa port, and the British military camp.

FATULS concentrated on "shopfloor" issues and argued that only socialist revolution would address the workers' needs by liberating Palestine from the imperialist stranglehold. It was allied to the National Liberation League. The Federation's newspaper al-Ittihad was distributed widely and read by the overwhelming majority of labor.

The organization was banned following Jordan's annexation of the West Bank in 1950.

References

Further sources
Aruri, Naseer Hasan (1972). Jordan: A Study in Political Development (1923-1965). Springer. 
Beinin, Joel (2001). Workers and Peasants in the Modern Middle East. Cambridge: Cambridge University Press. 
Connell, Dan (2001). Rethinking Revolution: New Strategies for Democracy & Social Justice: The Experiences of Eritrea, South Africa, Palestine and Nicaragua. The Red Sea Press. 
Younis, Mona M. (2000). Liberation and Democratization: The South African & Palestinian National Movements. University of Minnesota Press.

See also
Palestine Arab Workers Society
Palestine General Federation of Trade Unions
Histadrut

Economy of Mandatory Palestine
Federations
Trade unions established in 1942
Trade unions disestablished in 1950
Trade unions in Mandatory Palestine
1942 establishments in Mandatory Palestine
1950 disestablishments in the West Bank Governorate